is the title of two series of woodblock prints by Japanese ukiyo-e artist Hiroshige, depicting Mount Fuji in differing seasons and weather conditions from a variety of different places and distances. The 1852 series, published by Sanoya Kihei, are in landscape orientation using the chūban format, while the 1858 series are in the portrait ōban format and were published by Tsutaya Kichizō.

Prints
Note: All locations use the modern place names.

1852 series 
The images are shown in the order as determined by the Yamanashi Prefectural Museum. There is an alternate numbering scheme that corresponds to that given by Edmond de Goncourt in his work on Hokusai.

1858 series 

See also
Thirty-six Views of Mount Fuji by Hokusai

References

External links

 hiroshige.org.uk article on "36 Views" 1852
 hiroshige.org.uk article on "36 Views" 1858

1859 works
Print series by Hiroshige